Quercus rex is an Asian species of tree in the family Fagaceae. It has been found in the seasonal tropical forests of northern Indochina (Laos, Myanmar, Vietnam), northeastern India, and also in the province of Yunnan in southwestern China. It is placed in subgenus Cerris, section Cyclobalanopsis.

Quercus rex is a large tree up to 30 m. tall. Twigs are pale brown with a woolly coating of hairs. Leaves can be as much as 270 mm long.  The acorn is oblate, 25-35 × 35–50 mm, pale greyish-orange and tomentose when young; the apex is rounded to impressed; the scar is 20–25 mm in diameter and depressed. In China, flowering is in April–May, acorns are found from October–November.

References

External links
line drawing, Flora of China Illustrations vol. 4, fig. 381, drawings 1-3 at left
Photo of herbarium specimen at Missouri Botanical Garden, collected in Yunnan, showing leaves
Second photo of herbarium specimen at Missouri Botanical Garden, collected in Yunnan, showing acorns
 

rex
Flora of Arunachal Pradesh
Trees of China
Flora of Yunnan
Plants described in 1900
Trees of Indo-China